Malagueña may refer to:

 Malagueña, pertaining to the city of Málaga, Spain
 La malagueña, a painting from 1917 by Julio Romero de Torres

Music
Malagueña (genre), a Venezuelan genre of folk music
Malagueña (song), the sixth movement of the Suite Andalucia by Ernesto Lecuona, which became a popular song
Malagueñas (flamenco style), the flamenco palo or style
"Malagueña Salerosa", a 1947 Mexican song by Elpidio Ramírez, Roque Ramírez and Pedro Galindo
Malagueña, the second movement of Dmitri Shostakovich's Fourteenth Symphony
Malagueña, the second movement of Maurice Ravel's Rapsodie espagnole
Malagueña, a piece from Spanish composer Isaac Albéniz's famous piano composition España, Opus 165
Malagueña, a piece from composer Pablo de Sarasate's Spanish Dances, Op. 21